Gamow may refer to:

Gamów, a village in Poland
Gamow (crater), a large impact crater on the far side of the Moon
GAMOW, an acronym for the Godless Americans March on Washington
George Gamow, theoretical physicist and prize-winning science writer

See also
Gamov